Akilov (masculine) or Akilova (feminine) is a Russian surname. It originates either from the old-Russian nickname Akul (meaning crook, deceiver) or from the Greek given name Aquila (Ἀκύλας). Notable people with the surname include:

Kirill Akilov (born 1989), Russian football player
Natalya Akilova (born 1993), Kazakhstani volleyball player
Rakhmat Akilov, perpetrator of the 2017 Stockholm truck attack

See also
Akulov
Okulov

References

Russian-language surnames